Killers of the Flower Moon is an upcoming American Western crime drama film directed by Martin Scorsese and with a screenplay by Eric Roth and Scorsese, based on the best-selling 2017 non-fiction book Killers of the Flower Moon: The Osage Murders and the Birth of the FBI by David Grann. The story centers on a series of 1920s Oklahoma murders in the Osage Nation committed after oil was discovered on tribal land. Leonardo DiCaprio, who also serves as producer, stars alongside Robert De Niro, Jesse Plemons,  Lily Gladstone, and Brendan Fraser. The film marks the seventh collaboration between Scorsese and DiCaprio as well as the eleventh collaboration between Scorsese and De Niro.

The film is produced by Scorsese's Sikelia Productions and DiCaprio's Appian Way Productions and distributed by Paramount Pictures and Apple TV+. The $200 million budget is reportedly the largest amount ever spent on a film shot in Oklahoma.

Premise
Members of the Osage tribe in northeastern Oklahoma are murdered under mysterious circumstances in the 1920s, sparking a major FBI investigation directed by a 29-year-old J. Edgar Hoover and former Texas Ranger Tom White, described by Grann as "an old-style lawman."

Cast

Production

Development 

On March 10, 2016, Imperative Entertainment won the bidding war to make a film adaptation of David Grann's nonfiction book Killers of the Flower Moon and paid $5 million; the studio's Dan Friedkin and Bradley Thomas would produce the film. In April 2017, it was revealed that Martin Scorsese, Leonardo DiCaprio and Robert De Niro were considering involvement in the film, adapted by Eric Roth. In July 2017, production designer Dante Ferretti revealed that filming would begin in early 2018, with Scorsese directing and DiCaprio starring. However, production stalled until October 2018, when it was announced that the film would be Scorsese's next effort after completing The Irishman (2019). At that point, filming was due to begin in the summer of 2019.

Pre-production 
In June 2019, it was announced that Paramount Pictures would distribute the film. On July 26, 2019, Scorsese traveled to the Osage Nation in Pawhuska, Oklahoma to meet with Principal Chief Geoffrey Standing Bear to discuss how the Osage Nation could be involved with the film's production. Days later, it was reported that De Niro had joined the cast with filming tentatively set to commence in the summer of 2020.

In December 2019, Scorsese's cinematographer Rodrigo Prieto confirmed that the film was expected to start principal photography in March 2020, adding that the "look and feel of the film" was still being figured out. At the 26th Screen Actors Guild Awards on January 19, 2020, DiCaprio officially announced that he and De Niro will star in the film.  In April 2020, it was announced that the filming of Killers of the Flower Moon had been postponed indefinitely in response to the COVID-19 pandemic. Meanwhile, Scorsese had reached out to Netflix and Apple TV+ to finance and distribute the film, as Paramount had concerns about the film's budget reaching $200 million. Paramount was still open to a deal to be involved with the film alongside an additional partner. In May 2020, Apple TV+ was announced to co-finance and co-distribute the film, with Paramount remaining as distributor.

In February 2021, Lily Gladstone and Jesse Plemons were added to the cast. Though the role of Tom White, the lead FBI agent, was initially written for DiCaprio, DiCaprio pushed to instead portray the nephew of the film's primary antagonist played by De Niro. As a result, it was reported that Jesse Plemons was cast as Tom White to replace DiCaprio, while DiCaprio was cast as Ernest Burkhart. In March, Tantoo Cardinal, Cara Jade Myers, JaNae Collins and Jillian Dion were added to the cast. William Belleau, Louis Cancelmi, Jason Isbell, Sturgill Simpson, Tatanka Means, Michael Abbott Jr., Pat Healy, and Scott Shepherd joined in April.

In April 2021, Jack Fisk signed on as production designer for the film, marking the first collaboration between the Oscar nominee and Martin Scorsese. In June, Steve Eastin, Gary Basaraba and Barry Corbin joined the cast. In August 2021, it was announced that Brendan Fraser and John Lithgow had been added to the cast.

Filming 
Killers of the Flower Moon was expected to begin production in February 2021 in Oklahoma. Principal photography ultimately began on April 19, 2021, with filming taking place in Osage County and Washington County, namely Pawhuska, Fairfax and Bartlesville.

In a news release before the beginning of filming, Scorsese said: "We are thrilled to finally start production on Killers of the Flower Moon in Oklahoma. To be able to tell this story on the land where these events took place is incredibly important and critical to allowing us to portray an accurate depiction of the time and people. We're grateful to Apple, the Oklahoma Film and Music Office and The Osage Nation, especially all our Osage consultants and cultural advisors, as we prepare for this shoot. We're excited to start working with our local cast and crew to bring this story to life on screen and immortalize a time in American history that should not be forgotten."
 
On May 13, De Niro suffered a quadriceps muscle leg injury off-set and returned to New York City for medical attention; production was not delayed, as De Niro's subsequent scenes would be filmed in June 2021. Filming wrapped on October 1, 2021. On March 25, 2022, Osage Nation Principal Chief Geoffrey Standing Bear told the Tulsa Press Club "he was advised Killers of the Flower Moon is tentatively slated to film additional scenes of a traditional community dance in mid-May in Osage County."

Gladstone claimed in January 2023 that the input of the Osage Nation greatly changed the film from what Scorsese had originally envisioned and that their collaboration had positively impacted the film, stating in an interview at the 2023 Sundance Film Festival that "The work is better when you let the world inform your work".

Music
Frequent Scorsese collaborator Robbie Robertson of The Band composed the score.

Release 
Killers of the Flower Moon is expected to make its premiere at Cannes, Venice, or another film festival in 2023.

The film is distributed digitally by Apple Studios in co-distribution with Paramount Pictures.

References

External links 
 

Upcoming films
2023 films
2023 drama films
2023 Western (genre) films
2020s American films
2020s crime drama films
2020s English-language films
American crime drama films
American films based on actual events
American Western (genre) films
Appian Way Productions films
Apple TV+ original films
Crime films based on actual events
Drama films based on actual events
Films about the Federal Bureau of Investigation
Films based on non-fiction books
Films directed by Martin Scorsese
Films produced by Leonardo DiCaprio
Films produced by Martin Scorsese
Films scored by Robbie Robertson
Films set in Oklahoma
Films set in the 1920s
Films shot in Oklahoma
Films with screenplays by Eric Roth
Films with screenplays by Martin Scorsese
Paramount Pictures films
Upcoming English-language films
Western (genre) films based on actual events